Disharmony: Stand Out is the debut extended play of South Korean boy band P1Harmony. It was released by FNC Entertainment under license to Kakao M on October 28, 2020, including the lead single "Siren".

Composition 
All members participated in writing the lyrics of "Intro; Breakthrough".

Commercial performance 
The EP peaked at number five on the Gaon Album Chart and had sold 37,913 copies by January 2021.

Track listing

Charts

References 

2020 EPs
FNC Entertainment EPs
Korean-language EPs
P1Harmony EPs